Javad Bushehri (1893–1972), also known as Amir Homayun, was an Iranian businessman and statesman who held several government posts. In addition, he served at the Majlis and Senate and also, was the governor of the Fars province.

Early life and education
Javad Busehri was born in Bushehr in 1893. His father, Haj Mohammad Mo'in-al-Tojjar, was a businessman. After receiving education in his hometown Javad Busehri attended a German school in Tehran. Then he studied trade and economics in England and Switzerland.

Career and activities
Following his return to Iran Bushehri involved in business and politics. During the reign of Reza Shah he was a member of the Majlis representing Tehran. His relationship with Reza Shah became strained, and Bushehri left Iran for Europe due to his fear of being arrested by the Shah. He could come Iran only after the abdication of Reza Shah. Then Bushehri was appointed governor of the Fars province and then, was made the minister of agriculture in the cabinet of Prime Minister Abdolhossein Hazhir in 1948. The same year he was also elected to the Senate, but resigned from the post soon.

Bushehri was the minister of roads in the cabinet led by Prime Minister Mohammad Mosaddegh in the period 1951–1952. He also served as the spokesman of the Mosaddegh government.

In 1960 he was vice president of the celebration committee established for the anniversary of the Persian Empire and a senator.

Personal life and death
Bushehri was related to the Pahlavi family in that his nephew, Mehdi Bushehri, was the third husband of Princess Ashraf, sister of Shah Mohammad Reza Pahlavi. He died in 1972.

References

20th-century Iranian politicians
1893 births
1972 deaths
Government ministers of Iran
Members of the Senate of Iran
People of Pahlavi Iran
20th-century Iranian businesspeople
People from Bushehr
Agriculture ministers of Iran
Iranian governors